Ženski košarkaški klub Srbobran is a Serbian women's basketball team from Srbobran, Serbia. The club currently plays in Women's Serbian League.

History
Ženski košarkaški klub Srbobran was founded 29 January 2005, in 2011 was qualified for the First B league, and a year later the team was placed in the First A league of Serbia when a permanent member of the highest ranks of competition in Serbia. In the 2013–14 season he played in MŽRKL due to cancellation ŽKK Mladi Krajišnik from Banja Luka. Since its founding ŽKK Srbobran took part in competitions for all younger age categories.

Arena
Sports hall in Srbobran a multi-purpose type which includes: small hall, big hall, gym, bowling, chess hall and restaurant, is also suitable to reflect different aspects of events (festivals, fairs, concerts ...).

Current roster

Notable former players
Jovana Karakašević
Dara Kovačević

Notable former coaches

External links
 Profile on facebook.com
 Profile on eurobasket.com
 Profile on srbijasport.net

Srbobran
Basketball teams established in 2005